In the video game industry, 2023 is expected to see the release of many new video games.

Major events

Notable deaths
 January 5
 Sim Wong Hoo, 67, founder and CEO of Creative Labs
 Earl Boen, 81, voice actor across multiple media titles, including for World of Warcraft and Monkey Island
 January 29 – Annie Wersching, 45, actress known for voicing Tess in The Last of Us and Tassyn in Anthem
 February 14 - Tohru Okada, 73, musician and creator of the PlayStation logo sound effect.
 February 15 - Shōzō Iizuka, 89, voice actor across multiple media franchises, most notably as the Japanese dub of Doctor Neo Cortex in the Crash Bandicoot series.
 March 17 - Lance Reddick, 60, voice actor best known for the voice of Commander Zavala in the Destiny franchise.

Hardware releases

Game releases

January–March

April–June

July–September

October–December

Unscheduled releases

Video game-based film and television releases

Cancelled games

Notes

References

2023 in video gaming
Video games by year